Corpsing are an English extreme metal band. They have previously been signed to Jason Mendoca's (Akercocke) Goat of Mendes Records label and are due to release their next album through Grindethic Records.

Background 
Following his departure from his previous band Infestation in the year 2000, guitarist Giuseppe Cutispoto decided to form another metal band. He soon hooked up with his brother Mick (Lead Guitar) and started writing some material. Their initial intentions were to mix various metal elements such as Death, Black, Thrash and Doom with other, non metal influences. While writing the material they started looking for other band members to complete the line-up, and in 2002 Corpsing had a line-up and started rehearsing the material. After many months of rehearsals Corpsing were ready to record their debut album Watching the Thinker and in 2003 they signed to Goat of Mendes Records with whom later that year they would record their album. Watching the Thinker was subsequently released in October 2005. 

Since the release of their debut album the line-up changed, Giuseppe and Mick were joined by The Wizard (Vocals/Bass) and Nick "The Baron" Plews (drums). In 2006 Corpsing started rehearsing and gigging with the new line-up and in June started recording their second album with producer Andy Davies. During this time Corpsing were joined by David Adambery (Synth Lord/soundscapes) which added another previously unheard dimension to the sound.

Current line-up 
 Giuseppe Cutispoto - Guitar
 Mick Cutispoto - Guitar
 Kyle Austin - Vocals 
 Stevie Dewar - Bass guitar
 Nicholas Plews - Drums

Discography 
Watching the Thinker (Goat of Mendes Records, 2005)
The Stench of Humanity (Grindethic Records, 2007)
Regnum (2017)
Civilization Under Nefarious Tyrants (2020)

References 
 Bands official website
 Bands myspace website
 BBC Album Review
 Earthworks Studio Website
 Goat of Mendes Record Label Site
 Metal Hammer Magazine Interview - August 2005
 Biography in Terrorizer Magazine 2005

External links
 Bands official site
 Bands official myspace site
 Bands official Instagram
 Bands official Spotify

English black metal musical groups
English death metal musical groups
Blackened death metal musical groups
Musical groups established in 2000
Musical quartets